The Tōkyū Shin-Yokohama Line is a commuter line operated by Tokyu Corporation connecting Hiyoshi Station on the Tōkyū Tōyoko Line and Meguro Line to Shin-Yokohama Station on the Sōtetsu Shin-Yokohama Line. Tōkyū will be putting their company names as a formal part of the line names, which is a second for Tōkyū (the first being the Tōkyū Tamagawa Line). 

It is a part of the Eastern Kanagawa Line railway strategic plan for improving the rail network connectivity of Kanagawa Prefecture. The rail infrastructures of this line are maintained by the Japan Railway Construction, Transport and Technology Agency (JRTT). Tōkyū collects the operation revenue and pays JRTT for using the rail infrastructures, then JRTT use this payment to maintain the infrastructures and reimburse the loan for the construction of this line.

The Tōkyū Shin-Yokohama Line opened on 18 March 2023.

Summary 
The entire line runs between Shin-Yokohama and Hiyoshi. A new intermediate station,  is situated near Tsunashima Station on the Tōkyū Tōyoko Line.

Sōtetsu Shin-Yokohama Line trains run through service with Tōkyū, Toei Subway Lines via Shin-Yokohama.

Shin-Yokohama Station is jointly operated by Tōkyū and Sōtetsu. This is the first case for both operators to have a station with direct connections to the Shinkansen.

Routes and services 

Beyond Hiyoshi, trains head towards Shibuya via Tōkyū Tōyoko Line or Meguro via Tōkyū Meguro Line.

In mid-2022 it was announced that through service trains to the Tōkyū Tōyoko Line can continue along the Tokyo Metro Fukutoshin Line to Wakōshi and further on the Tōbu Tōjō Line. However, trains will not be allowed to run through on the Seibu Yūrakuchō & Ikebukuro Lines and must transfer at Kotake-Mukaihara Station. Beyond Shin-Yokohama and Nishiya, Tōyoko line trains will run express service along the Izumino Line to  station.

It has been proposed that the Tōkyū Shin-Yokohama Line operate 14 trains per hour during rush hours, with 4 heading to the Tōyoko Line, and 10 heading to the Meguro Line. Meguro-bound Shin-Yokohama Line trains will operate through services not only to the Meguro Line, but also the Toei Mita Subway Line and Tokyo Metro Nanboku Line, with further service onto the Saitama Rapid Railway Line. Once connected to the Sōtetsu network at Shin-Yokohama, Meguro line trains will run express along the Main Line to  station.

In 2016, Toei announced that its 13 6300 series trainsets (1st and 2nd batch) would be replaced, and in 2019 9 new trainsets compatible with the Sōtetsu Line would begin service, with more trainsets to be produced until 2021. In 2018, they ramped up their plans and announced that 13 new trainsets with the same designation numbers as the 13 that are replaced will be introduced to service. These new models will be in 8-car formation, made by Kinki Sharyo and classified as 6500 series. The first of these sets entered service on 14 May 2022. Meanwhile, the 3rd batch of 6300 series trainsets will continue their service on the Mita Line, but they will still be upgraded to enable compatibility with the Sōtetsu Line, by introducing digitized communications equipment and the ATS-P system. With Mita Line trainsets extending to 8-cars, Sōtetsu is undergoing preparations to enable compatibility with 8-car trains. Additionally, Sōtetsu has also introduced its 20000 series which is to be used on Tōkyū through services, and has been in service since February 2018. The 20000 series will be produced in 10-car sets and 8-cars, with the 10-car sets not entering the Tōkyū Meguro Line and the Toei Mita Line. Moreover, the 20000 series is not intended to be used on JR through services. 

Station numbers for the Tōkyū Shin-Yokohama Line between Shin-Yokohama and Hiyoshi were revealed on 16 September 2022.

Through the end of 2022, various trainsets from Tōkyū, Sōtetsu, Tokyo Metro, Toei, and Tōbu conducted tests along the now completed segment of this line and the Sōtetsu Shin-Yokohama Line between Hiyoshi and Hazawa Yokohama-Kokudai.

On 16 December 2022, Tōkyū, Sōtetsu, and the Japan Railway Construction, Transport and Technology Agency announced that the Tōkyū Shin-Yokohama Line would open on 18 March 2023. The Sōtetsu Shin-Yokohama Line section between Shin-Yokohama and Hazawa Yokohama-Kokudai also began serving at the same time. The Shin-Yokohama Line opened as scheduled on 18 March 2023, providing through service between Shin-Yokohama and Hiyoshi.

Service Pattern  
Upon opening of the line, the typical weekday off-peak services are as follows:

 Northbound (Inbound): 6  (Down from a peak of 15 tph during rush) 
 2 tph Express to  via the Tōkyū Meguro Line and Toei Mita Line
 2 tph Express to  via the Tōkyū Meguro Line and Tokyo Metro Namboku Line, with one continuing to  via the Saitama Rapid Railway Line
 2 tph Express to  via the Tōkyū Tōyoko Line and Tokyo Metro Fukutoshin Line, with one continuing to  via the Tobu Tojo Line
 Southbound (Outbound): 6 tph (Down from a peak of 11 tph during rush) 
 2 tph to  via the Sōtetsu Shin-Yokohama Line and Sōtetsu Main Line
 2 tph to  via the Sōtetsu Shin-Yokohama Line, Main Line, and Izumino Line
 2 tph terminating at

Station list 
 All stations are located in Yokohama, Kanagawa Prefecture

Rolling stock 
Tokyu 5050-4000 series 10-car trains
Tokyu 5080 series 8-car trains
Tokyu 3000 series 8-car trains
Tokyu 3020 series 8-car trains

Sotetsu 20000 series 10-car trains
Sotetsu 21000 series 8-car trains
Tokyo Metro 9000 series 8-car trains
Toei 6500 series 8-car trains

References

External links 
 Opening date official press release (in Japanese)

Lines of Tokyu Corporation
1067 mm gauge railways in Japan
2023 in rail transport